Don Bowman may refer to:
Don Bowman (politician) (1936–2013), Australian politician
Don Bowman (singer) (1937–2013), American country music singer, songwriter, comedian and radio host
Don "Sugarcane" Harris (1938–1999), American musician aka Don Bowman